The 2022–23 Bobsleigh World Cup was a multi-race series over a season for bobsleigh. The season started in Whistler, Canada on 26 November 2022 and ended in Sigulda, Latvia on 19 February 2023. The season sponsor was BMW.

Calendar 
Below is the schedule of the 2022/23 season.

Bobsleigh World Cup

Map of world cup hosts 
All 7 locations hosting world cup events in this season. (including St. Moritz – venue of the World Championships).

Results

Two-man

Four-man

Monobob

Two-woman

Standings

Two-man

Four-man

Monobob

Two-woman

Medal table

Points

References 

Bobsleigh World Cup
2022 in bobsleigh
2023 in bobsleigh